The 34th FIE Fencing World Cup began in October 2004 and concluded in October 2005 at the 2005 World Fencing Championships in Leipzig, Germany.

Individual Épée

Individual Foil

Individual Sabre

Team Épée

Team Foil

Team Sabre

References 
 FIE rankings

Fencing World Cup
2004 in fencing
2005 in fencing
International fencing competitions hosted by Germany
2005 in German sport